Below are the rosters for the 2007 U-20 World Cup CONCACAF qualifying tournament held in Panama and Mexico from 7 January to 25 February 2007.

Group A

Guatemala
Coach:  Rodrigo Kenton

Haiti
Coach:  Claudio Frean

Panama
Coach:  Julio Dely Valdés

United States
Coach:  Thomas Rongen

Group B

Costa Rica
Coach:  Geovanni Alfaro

Jamaica
Coach:  Dean Weatherly

Mexico
Coach:  Jesús Ramírez

Saint Kitts and Nevis
Coach:  Lester Morris

References

2007 CONCACAF U-20 Championship squads
squads